Thomas Joseph Murphy (born November 21, 1935) is an American former middle distance runner, who represented his native country at the 1960 Summer Olympics in Rome, Italy. He is best known for winning the gold medal in the men's 800 metres event at the 1959 Pan American Games in Chicago.

Murphy graduated from Manhattan College in 1958.

References

 

1935 births
Living people
Track and field athletes from New York City
American male middle-distance runners
Athletes (track and field) at the 1959 Pan American Games
Athletes (track and field) at the 1960 Summer Olympics
Olympic track and field athletes of the United States
Sportspeople from Brooklyn
Manhattan College alumni
Pan American Games gold medalists for the United States
Pan American Games medalists in athletics (track and field)
Medalists at the 1959 Pan American Games